Fireman, Save My Child is a 1932 American Pre-Code comedy film starring comedian Joe E. Brown and directed by Lloyd Bacon. The picture was produced by the First National Pictures and released by their parent Warner Brothers. The supporting cast features Evalyn Knapp, Lilian Bond and Guy Kibbee.

The film was remade in 1954.

Plot

Cast
Joe E. Brown - Smokey Joe Grant
Evalyn Knapp - Sally Toby
Lilian Bond - June Farnum
Guy Kibbee - Pop Devlin
Richard Carle - Dan Toby
George MacFarlane - St. Louis Fire Chief
Frank Shellenback - Pitcher
Virginia Sale - Miss Gallop
Curtis Benton - Radio Announcer
George Meeker - Stevens
George Ernest - Mascot for St. Louis Team
Ben Hendricks, Jr. - Larkin
Walter Walker - Mr. Platt
Dickie Moore - Herbie, Mascot's Pal
Junior Coghlan - Mascot's Pal

Box Office
According to Warner Bros records, the film earned $505,000 domestically and $99,000 domestically.

Preservation status
The film is preserved in the Library of Congress collection.

References

External links
 Fireman, Save My Child in the Internet Movie Database
 

1932 films
1930s sports comedy films
American baseball films
American black-and-white films
American sports comedy films
Films directed by Lloyd Bacon
Films about firefighting
First National Pictures films
Warner Bros. films
1932 comedy films
1930s English-language films
1930s American films